Crematogaster cornuta is a species of ant in tribe Crematogastrini. It was described by Crawley in 1924.

References

cornuta
Insects described in 1924